Maduravoyal is a legislative assembly constituency in Chennai district in the Indian state of Tamil Nadu. Its State Assembly Constituency number is 7. It consists of a portion of Ambattur taluk and part of Chennai Corporation. It falls under Sriperumbudur Lok Sabha constituency. It is one of the 234 State Legislative Assembly Constituencies in Tamil Nadu, in India. Elections and winners from this constituency are listed below.

Tamil Nadu

Election results

2021

2016

2011

References 

 

Assembly constituencies of Tamil Nadu
Tiruvallur district